Aigues-Vives is a commune in the Gard department in southern France.

Population

Education
The Groupe scolaire Jean Macé has maternelle (preschool/nursery) and primaire (primary) levels. It opened in 1913.

The collège (junior high school) serving the community is Collège de Gallargues-le-Montueux in Gallargues-le-Montueux. In addition to Aigues-Vives and Gallargues-le-Montueux, it also serves Aimargues. It opened in September 2014.  it has about 600 students.

Transport

See also
Communes of the Gard department

References

External links

Aiguesvives.fr: Information website of Aigues-Vives
Aigues-vives.tv: Pictures and videos of Aigues-Vives

 
Aiguesvives